Jamie Robert Cook (born 8 July 1985) is an English guitarist and songwriter. He is best known as the guitarist and a founding member of the indie rock band Arctic Monkeys, with whom he has recorded seven studio albums.

Arctic Monkeys
Jamie Cook attended Ecclesfield Secondary School in Chapeltown, Sheffield. Originally a next door neighbour of fellow band member Alex Turner, Cook and the other band members picked up their respective instruments and formed the Arctic Monkeys in 2002. He is the son of an engineer.

At the start of the band's career, Cook would join Matt Helders and Andy Nicholson (later Nick O'Malley) in backing vocals for songs such as "Fake Tales of San Francisco", but has gradually shied away from singing duties, leaving them to the other three members of the group.

In the band's early stages, Cook was considered to be the "indie music fanatic" of the group, enjoying The Smiths, The Strokes, Oasis, and Queens of the Stone Age.

Cook was also instrumental in the minimal exposure of the band's sixth album, Tranquility Base Hotel & Casino, prior to its release. He was also the first band member to help Turner develop the somewhat autobiographical album from a potential solo record into a bona-fide Arctic Monkeys one, further indicating his behind-the-scenes importance to the band.

Personal life 
Cook began dating model Katie Downes in 2006. They became engaged in 2012 and were married on 31 May 2014. They have a son, Forrest (b. 2015), and a daughter, Bonnie (b. 2019).

Equipment

Guitars
Fender Telecaster (2002–2006)
Gibson ES-335 (2006–present)
Gibson Les Paul (2007–2009, 2018–present)
Gretsch Spectra Sonic Baritone (2009–2010, 2014)
Fender Starcaster (2009–2014, 2022–present)
Fender Telecaster Deluxe (2011–2012)
Gibson SG (2013–2014, 2022-present)

When touring to promote their 2006 debut, Cook's setup was fairly simple. His main guitar was a Fender Telecaster 62 reissue. His pedals were an MXR Distortion +, Electro-Harmonix Big Muff, Electro-Harmonix Pulsar and, at least for a while, he could be seen using a T-Rex Dr. Swamp twin distortion pedal. He also had a Boss TU-2 Chromatic Tuner. His amplifier was a Hiwatt Custom 50-Watt 2×12 Combo.

From 2007's Favourite Worst Nightmare onwards, he has had quite an elaborate pedalboard. The pedals used have almost changed altogether—he stuck to his MXR Distortion +, and has added an Electro-Harmonix Little Big Muff, Electro-Harmonix HOG, Electro-Harmonix Pulsar Tremolo, Electro-Harmonix Deluxe Memory Man, a Boss LS-2 Line Selector, a Guyatone distortion and an expression pedal for the HOG all this was changed to an Ernie Ball volume pedal, which can be seen used when playing the Arctic Monkeys song "Nettles" live. His main guitar is now a 1975 Gibson ES-335TD. He has been seen using several different Bad Cat amplifiers, including a Bad Cat Hot Cat 30 R, in addition to his Hiwatt amplifiers. For the Suck It and See tour, a Rosewell Bluesman 30 and an Audio Kitchen Big Chopper was used.

On the Australia and New Zealand tour of Humbug, Cook was seen using a Fender Starcaster. His Gibson 335TD has been changed from a Frequensator tailpiece to a Bigsby. His pedalboard has changed quite considerably since the Favourite Worst Nightmare tour. It now consists of an Electro-Harmonix Pulsar (without stereo), Electro-Harmonix Memory Man, Boss RE-20, Boss TU-2, Death By Audio Fuzz Gun, Z.Vex Super Duper, Fulltone OCD, Demeter Fuzzullator, Boss LS-2, Ernie Ball VP Junior. He was also seen using a Gibson SG standard on stage live at Glastonbury in June 2013.

References

1985 births
Living people
English rock guitarists
Musicians from Sheffield
Arctic Monkeys members